The 1992 FIBA European League Final Four, or 1992 FIBA EuroLeague Final Four, was the 1991–92 season's FIBA European League Final Four tournament, organized by FIBA Europe.

Partizan won its first title, after defeating Montigalà Joventut in the final game, with a buzzer-beater by Saša Djordjević.

Bracket

Semifinals

Partizan - Philips Milano

Montigalà Joventut - Estudiantes Argentaria

Third place game

Final

Final standings

Awards

FIBA European League Final Four MVP 
  Sasha Danilović ( Partizan)

FIBA European League Finals Top Scorer 
  Sasha Danilović ( Partizan)

FIBA European League All-Final Four Team

References

External links 
 1991–92 EuroLeague at FIBAEurope.com
 Linguasport

1991–92 in European basketball
1991–92
1991–92 in Turkish basketball
1991–92 in Spanish basketball
1991–92 in Italian basketball
1991–92 in Yugoslav basketball
International basketball competitions hosted by Turkey
Sports competitions in Istanbul
1990s in Istanbul